Richard Charlesworth may refer to:
Ric Charlesworth (born 1952), Australian cricketer and field hockey player and coach
Richard Charlesworth (swimmer) (born 1988), English swimmer